Augusta Preparatory Day School (APDS) is a non-sectarian, independent school in Augusta, Georgia, United States. It accepts students from age two through twelfth grade.

History
Augusta Preparatory School began with 38 students in grades 7–12 on September 5, 1961. Augusta Country Day School was founded in 1972, and accepted students from kindergarten through fifth grade. The schools were merged to form Augusta Preparatory Day School in 1988.

Today, Augusta Prep is organized into three divisions: The Lower School enrolls students age two through grade 4, the Middle School enrolls students in grades 5 through 8, and the Upper School enrolls students in grades 9 through 12. Augusta Prep features Spanish introduced in kindergarten, chess starting in first grade, a world fair (global education) in fourth grade, fine arts introduced in Lower School, cyber and robotics in Middle and Upper School, French and Spanish in Middle School, performing arts in Middle and Upper School, athletics in Middle and Upper School. The Upper School offers more than 20 AP courses in engaging and challenging environment.

Larry Mize, the 1987 Masters champion, graduated from Augusta Prep in 1976.

On Nov. 6, 2020, Middle School math teacher Ryan Kho was named the Georgia Independent Schools Association (GISA) Middle School Teacher of the Year.

Athletics

At the varsity level, Augusta Prep is a member of the Georgia Independent School Association competes in Region 4-AA. Prep has 19 varsity sports, to include baseball, basketball, clay target shooting, cheerleading, cross country, football, golf, soccer, swimming, tennis, track and field and volleyball. 

Augusta Prep has one of the best athletics programs in the Augusta area with 56 State Championships, 55 State Runner-up Championships and 159 Region Championships in our 60-year school history. In the 2018–19 school year, Augusta Prep featured 85 percent of all students competing in at least one sports in grades 6–12, with 59 percent playing two sports and 28 percent playing three sports. Middle School teams won seven championships and added three-up titles. The Upper School varsity sports teams won three GISA championships (girls cross country, girls track and field, girls soccer), added four state runner-up finishes (boys swimming, girls swimming, boys cross country, boys track and field) and took home eight GISA region championships. Augusta Prep won the GISA Class AAA All-Sports Trophy for 2018–19.

Region 4-AAA All-Sports Champion: 2005, 2008, 2009, 2014, 2016, 2017, 2018, 2019
GISA Class AAA All-Sports Champion: 2019
1971–1972 Men's Soccer GISA Champions
1976–1977 Men's Soccer GISA Champions
1993–1994 Men's Tennis Class AA GISA Champions
1994–1995 Men's Tennis Class AAA GISA Champions
1994–1995 Women's Tennis Class AAA GISA Champions
1995–1996 Women's Tennis Class AAA GISA Champions
1996–1997 Men's Tennis Class AA GISA Champions
1996–1997 Women's Tennis Class AA GISA Champions
1997–1998 Men's Tennis Class AA GISA Champions
1997–1998 Women's Tennis Class AA GISA Champions
1998–1999 Men's Tennis Class AAA GISA Champions
1998–1999 Women's Tennis Class AAA GISA Champions
1999–2000 Golf Class AAA GISA Champions
1999–2000 Men's Tennis Class AAA GISA Champions
2000–2001 Men's Tennis Class AAA GISA Champions
2001–2002 Men's Cross Country Class AAA GISA Champions
2002–2003 Golf Class AAA GISA Champions
2002–2003 Women's Cross Country Class AAA GISA Champions
2003–2004 Men's Tennis Class AAA GISA Champions
2004–2005 Men's Tennis Class AAA GISA Champions
2004–2005 Women's Cross Country Class AAA GISA Champions
2004–2005 Women's Tennis Class AAA GISA Champions
2005–2006 Golf Class AAA GISA Champions
2005–2006 Men's Tennis Class AA GISA Champions
2005–2006 Men's Tennis Class AAA GISA Champions
2006–2007 Volleyball Class AAA GISA Champions
2007–2008 Volleyball Class AAA GISA Champions
2007–2008 Women's Tennis Class AAA GISA Champions
2008–2009 Men's Swimming Class AAA GISA Champions
2008–2009 Women's Cross Country Class AAA GISA Champions
2009–2010 Men's Swimming GISA Champions
2010–2011 Women's Cross Country GISA Champions
2010-2011 Men's Swimming GISA Champions
2010-2011 Women's Tennis GISA Champions
2011-2012 Women's Cross Country GISA Champions
2011–2012 Men's Swimming GISA Champions
2013–2014 Men's Football GISA Champions
2013–2014 Men's Golf GISA Champions
2013–2014 Women's Soccer GISA Champions
2014–2015 Women's Soccer GISA Champions
2014–2015 Women's Tennis GISA Champions
2015–2016 Women's Soccer GISA Champions
2016–2017 Men's Swimming GISA Champions
2016–2017 Women's Soccer GISA Champions
2017–2018 Men's Cross Country GISA Champions
2017–2018 Women's Cross Country GISA Champions
2018–2019 Women's Cross Country GISA Champions
2018–2019 Women's Track and Field GISA Champions
2018–2019 Women's Soccer GISA Champions
2019-2020 Men's Cross Country GISA Champions
2019-2020 Women's Cross Country GISA Champions
2020-2021 Men's Cross Country GISA Champions
2020-2021 Women's Soccer GISA Champions
2021-2022 Women's Cross Country GISA Champions
2021-2022 Men's Cross Country GISA Champions
2021-2022 Women's Cross Country GISA Champions

References

External links
 

High schools in Columbia County, Georgia
Private high schools in Georgia (U.S. state)
Private middle schools in Georgia (U.S. state)
Private elementary schools in Georgia (U.S. state)